is a Japanese jazz drummer and percussionist. He is known for being the long time drummer for Toshinori Kondo's band Kondo IMA. He also collaborated with Arto Lindsay, John Zorn, Sakamoto Ryuichi, Hosono Haruomi, Robert Palmer and Bill Laswell.

References

External links

1952 births
Living people
Avant-garde jazz musicians
Free improvisation
Japanese jazz musicians